JSB Compétition is a French auto racing team based in Camps-en-Amiénois, France. The team has raced in the SEAT León Eurocup & TCR International Series, since 2014 & 2015 respectively.

TCR International Series

SEAT León Cup Racer (2015–)
After having raced in the SEAT León Eurocup in 2014, the team will enter the 2015 TCR International Series season with Lucile Cypriano and David Cebrián driving an SEAT León Cup Racer each.

External links

References

French auto racing teams
TCR International Series teams
Auto racing teams established in 2007